Sergey Timofeyev (19 March 1950 – 5 July 2021) was a Soviet wrestler. He competed in the men's freestyle 62 kg at the 1976 Summer Olympics.

References

External links
 

1950 births
2021 deaths
Soviet male sport wrestlers
Olympic wrestlers of the Soviet Union
Wrestlers at the 1976 Summer Olympics
Sportspeople from Kazan